The 1994 Grote Prijs Jef Scherens was the 28th edition of the Grote Prijs Jef Scherens cycle race and was held on 4 September 1994. The race started and finished in Leuven. The race was won by Mauro Bettin.

General classification

References

1994
1994 in road cycling
1994 in Belgian sport
September 1994 sports events in Europe